Artyom Vladimirovich Argokov (born January 16, 1976) is a Kazakhstani professional ice hockey player who is a defenceman for Beibarys Atyrau. He played for the Kazakhstan men's national ice hockey team in the 2006 Winter Olympics and the 2007 World Ice Hockey Championships.

Career statistics

Regular season and playoffs

International

References

1976 births
Living people
Sportspeople from Oskemen
Ice hockey players at the 2006 Winter Olympics
Olympic ice hockey players of Kazakhstan
Asian Games silver medalists for Kazakhstan
Medalists at the 2003 Asian Winter Games
Medalists at the 2007 Asian Winter Games
Ice hockey players at the 2003 Asian Winter Games
Ice hockey players at the 2007 Asian Winter Games
Asian Games medalists in ice hockey